Swamp Gold is a 1978 album by Freddy Fender that was released on ABC Records.

Track listing 
"The Clock" (Freddie Fender ( Baldemar Huerta))
"She's About a Mover" (Doug Sahm )
"When It Rains It Really Pours" (Billy "The Kid" Emerson)
"It's Raining" (Naomi Neville)
"I'm Leaving It All Up to You"
"Tell It Like It Is" (George Davis/Lee Diamond )
"My Tears Are Falling Tonight Love" 
"Talk To Me" (Joe Seneca)
"These Arms of Mine" (Otis Redding)
"Breaking Up Is Hard (To Do)" (Neil Sedaka/Howard Greenfield)
"We've Got To Stop And Think It Over"
"Graduation Night (As You Pass Me By)"
"I'm Asking Forgiveness"
"Just a Moment of Your Time" (Freddie Fender (a.k.a. Baldemar Huerta))
"Please Mr. Sandman" (Pat Ballard)

References 

Freddy Fender albums
1978 albums
ABC Records albums